The Second Shot is a 1943 German drama film directed by Martin Frič and starring Gustav Waldau, Susi Nicoletti and Hana Vítová. It was shot at the Barrandov Studios in Prague.

Cast
 Gustav Waldau as Baron von Neuhaus
 Susi Nicoletti as Irene Neuhaus
 Hana Vítová as Maris Schwanderer (as Hanna Witt)
 Richard Häussler as Georg von Romberg
 Ernst von Klipstein as Franz von Gerlach
 Pepi Glöckner-Kramer as Anna
 Eva Tinschmann as Fabrici
 Karl Günther as Stollberg (as Carl Günther)
 Fritz Kampers as Gastwirt
 Louis Soldan as Graf Altwyl
 Raoul Schránil as Mr. Neugebauer (as Roland Schranil)

References

Bibliography
 Tereza Dvořáková & Ivan Klimeš. Prag-Film AG 1941–1945: im Spannungsfeld zwischen Protektorats- und Reichskinematografie. 2008.

External links
 

1943 films
German historical drama films
1940s historical drama films
1940s German-language films
German black-and-white films
Films of Nazi Germany
Films directed by Martin Frič
Films shot at Barrandov Studios
1943 drama films
1940s German films